The Welsh Bowls Federation (WBF) (established 2001) is an umbrella partnership body comprising representatives from the six national governing bodies: the Welsh Bowling Association; the Welsh Indoor Bowls Association; the Welsh Ladies Indoor Bowling Association; the Welsh Short Mat Bowls Association; the Welsh Women’s Bowling Association; ((Welsh Crown Green Bowling Association)). The two service bodies; The Welsh Bowls Coaching Association and Welsh Bowls Umpires Association are also represented. The WBF has 670 affiliated clubs and over 25,000 members.

The Welsh Bowls Federation is based at Sophia Gardens, Cardiff.

References

External links
Official website

Sports governing bodies in Wales
Bowls in Wales
2001 establishments in Wales